Mary Jane O'Meara Sanders (née O'Meara, formerly Driscoll;  born January 3, 1950) is an American social worker, college administrator, activist, and political strategist. Sanders was provost and interim president of Goddard College (1996–1997) and president of Burlington College (2004–2011). In June 2017, she founded the think tank The Sanders Institute. She has been married to U.S. Senator Bernie Sanders since May 28, 1988. She has also served as the first lady of Burlington, Vermont, during her husband's term as mayor.

Education and personal life
Sanders was born Mary Jane O'Meara on January 3, 1950, and grew up in Brooklyn, as one of the five children of Bernadette Joan (Sheridan) and Benedict P. O'Meara. She is of Irish descent and was raised Catholic. She attended Catholic schools, including Saint Saviour High School, before attending the University of Tennessee. O'Meara dropped out of school and moved back to Brooklyn with her first husband, David Driscoll. In 1975, they moved to Vermont when Driscoll's employer, IBM, transferred him. The couple divorced in 1980. She has three children (Heather Titus, Carina Driscoll, and David Driscoll) from her marriage with Driscoll, who were later adopted by Sanders.

O'Meara finished her college degree at Goddard College in Plainfield, Vermont, with a bachelor's in social work. She met Bernie Sanders in 1981, ten days before his first campaign victory as Mayor of Burlington, and again at his victory party; the couple married in 1988.

In 1996, she earned a doctorate in leadership studies in politics and education from Union Institute & University headquartered in Cincinnati, Ohio.

Sanders is Roman Catholic. She does not regularly attend Mass, but sometimes visits Saint Anne's Shrine when facing problems.

Career
Early in her career Sanders worked in the Juvenile Division of the Burlington Police Department, and then as a community organizer with the King Street Area Youth Center, and as a volunteer for AmeriCorps VISTA.

From 1981 to 1991, Sanders served as founding Director of the Mayor's Youth Office and Department Head in the City of Burlington. She was also active in K-12 education, elected as a School Board Commissioner, and was a founding member of the Women's Council & the Film Commission. In 1991, her husband, Bernie Sanders, was elected to the U.S. Congress. From 1991 to 1995, she worked in his office on a volunteer basis.

In 1996, Sanders was appointed as Provost and Interim President of her alma mater, Goddard College, to help the college through a difficult period. The Board, faculty, staff, students and Sanders worked together to improve the accreditation, finances and governance of the institution.

From 2004 through 2011, Sanders was President of Burlington College, a small liberal arts college founded in 1972 for non-traditional students. It closed due to financial problems in 2016.

As senior partner in the Burlington-based consulting firm, Leadership Strategies, O'Meara worked as a political and educational consultant for federal, state, and local political campaigns.

Sanders was instrumental in founding The Sanders Institute, a progressive think tank which launched in June 2017, and is one of its 11 original fellows. Like the other fellows, she does not receive payment for her work, although she does receive compensation for travel expenses.

Adviser and aide to Bernie Sanders
Bernie Sanders has described his wife as "one of [his] key advisers", and he has employed her at various times as "an administrative assistant, spokeswoman, policy adviser, chief of staff, and media buyer". In a 1996 article in The Washington Post, she was credited with helping him draft "more than 50 pieces of legislation".

She has served in Sanders's Congressional office as Chief of Staff and as Policy and Press Adviser, and also serves as an Alternate Commissioner for the Texas Low Level Radioactive Waste Disposal Compact Commission.

Burlington College presidency

In 2004, Sanders was named President of Burlington College, a private, non-profit liberal arts school founded in 1972 in Vermont. She increased the small college's fundraising. During her tenure as President, Burlington had an endowment of "about $150,000", and fundraising revenue had increased from about $25,000 when Sanders first arrived to $1.25 million by 2011. In 2010, Sanders oversaw the purchase of property formerly owned and occupied by the Roman Catholic Diocese of Burlington. The College based the real estate purchase on projections that enrollment would rapidly grow from fewer than 200 to as many as 750 students, with a corresponding income increase from tuition fees.

In 2011, the College's Board of Trustees, while crediting Sanders with acquiring a permanent campus for the 200‑student college, called a meeting for September 2011 and accepted Sanders's resignation. "We reached a decision which I believe is best for both the College and me," Sanders said after the meeting, "The board and I have different visions for the future and that's perfectly fine." On departure, she received the title of President Emeritus and a $200,000 severance, consisting of one year's pay, along with certain retirement and bonus payments. With the College unable to collect on some promised pledges after Sanders had resigned, and the enrollment increase plans failing, the Diocese settled the loan debt with the College in 2015 for $996,000, less than the agreed amount, and with $1 million of the repayment made in shares of an unidentified LLC company.

References

1950 births
20th-century Roman Catholics
21st-century Roman Catholics
American community activists
American people of Irish descent
American Roman Catholics
American social workers
Heads of universities and colleges in the United States
American women academics
Bernie Sanders
Goddard College alumni
Living people
People from Brooklyn
People from Burlington, Vermont
Union Institute & University alumni
University of Tennessee alumni
Activists from New York (state)
Activists from Vermont
Women heads of universities and colleges
21st-century American women